Hai-Cheng Gong (born 28 December 1998) is a Chinese professional baseball pitcher for the Shanghai Golden Eagles.

Career
On May 6, 2017 Gong was signed by the Pittsburgh Pirates organization to a minor league contract, becoming the second player to sign with an MLB club from that league's Mainland China development centres. He made his professional debut in 2018 with the GCL Pirates, posting a 5.40 ERA in 11 appearances. Gong split the 2019 season between the Low-A West Virginia Black Bears, the GCL Pirates, and the rookie-level Bristol Pirates, but struggled to an 0-2 record and 6.66 ERA in 14 games between the three teams. On November 15, 2019, Gong was released by the Pirates organization.

International career
He represented China at the 2016 U18 Asian baseball tournament, 2017 World Baseball Classic and 2018 Asian Games.

References

External links

1998 births
2017 World Baseball Classic players
Asian Games competitors for China
Baseball pitchers
Baseball players at the 2018 Asian Games
Chinese expatriate baseball players in the United States
Gulf Coast Pirates players
Living people
People from Bengbu
2023 World Baseball Classic players